Raw Tracks is a duo of EPs by American heavy metal band Mötley Crüe released exclusively in Japan in 1988 and 1990.

Overview 
The first EP disc features two songs presented in their original Leathür Records mix from their debut album, two remixes and one live version of tracks previously issued on the group's previous records.

The second EP disc features two live tracks, a cover and two studio tracks from previous albums.

Track listing

Raw Tracks II

References 

Mötley Crüe EPs
1988 debut EPs
1988 remix albums
Remix EPs
Elektra Records remix albums
Elektra Records EPs